António Miguel Santa Marta de Faria Leal (10 March 1961 – 26 October 2021) was a Portuguese equestrian. He competed in the individual jumping event at the 1996 Summer Olympics.

References

External links
 

1961 births
2021 deaths
Portuguese male equestrians
Olympic equestrians of Portugal
Equestrians at the 1996 Summer Olympics
Sportspeople from Lisbon
Place of birth missing